The 1992–93 season was the 47th season in Rijeka's history. It was their 2nd season in the Prva HNL and 19th successive top tier season.

Competitions

Prva HNL

Classification

Results summary

Results by round

Matches

Prva HNL

Source: HRnogomet.com

Croatian Cup

Source: HRnogomet.com

Squad statistics
Competitive matches only.  Appearances in brackets indicate numbers of times the player came on as a substitute.

See also
1992–93 Prva HNL
1992–93 Croatian Cup

References

External links
 1992–93 Prva HNL at HRnogomet.com
 1992–93 Croatian Cup at HRnogomet.com 
 Prvenstvo 1992.-93. at nk-rijeka.hr

HNK Rijeka seasons
Rijeka